Congress Township is one of the sixteen townships of Morrow County, Ohio, United States.  The 2010 census found 2,701 people in the township.

Geography
Located in the northern part of the county, it borders the following townships:
North Bloomfield Township - north
Troy Township - northeast corner
Perry Township - east
Franklin Township - south
Gilead Township - southwest
Washington Township - northwest

No municipalities are located in Congress Township.

Name and history
Statewide, the only other Congress Township is located in Wayne County.

Government
The township is governed by a three-member board of trustees, who are elected in November of odd-numbered years to a four-year term beginning on the following January 1. Two are elected in the year after the presidential election and one is elected in the year before it. There is also an elected township fiscal officer, who serves a four-year term beginning on April 1 of the year after the election, which is held in November of the year before the presidential election. Vacancies in the fiscal officership or on the board of trustees are filled by the remaining trustees.

References

External links
County website

Townships in Morrow County, Ohio
Townships in Ohio